Koli-ye Sofla (also Romanized as Kolī-ye Soflá; also known as Kolū-ye Pā'īn and Kolū-ye Soflá) is a village in Arshaq-e Shomali Rural District, Arshaq District, Meshgin Shahr County, Ardabil Province, Iran. At the 2006 census, its population was 275, in 55 families.

References 

Towns and villages in Meshgin Shahr County